Meta ULC was a Canadian unlimited liability corporation performing big data analysis of scientific literature, which was acquired by the Chan Zuckerberg Initiative and shut down in 2021, effective in 2022.

History

Beginning
Meta Inc., formerly Sciencescape Inc., was founded in 2010 by Sam and Amy Molyneux. Before co-founding Meta, Sam Molyneux studied cancer genomics at the Ontario Cancer Institute at Princess Margaret Hospital in Toronto. The service was developed with the intention of curating the millions of articles in the area of academic publishing.

The company was headquartered in Redwood City, California (formerly Toronto, Ontario, Canada) and operated Meta Science, a literature discovery platform.

As of September 2016, Meta had analyzed over 26 million papers and profiled 14 million researchers.  Using natural language processing, Meta scans articles - as well as the millions of articles stored in open-access repositories - collecting information about authors, citations and topics. Participating publishers receive exposure for their journals in return. These include the American Medical Association, BioMed Central, Elsevier, Karger, SAGE Publishing, Taylor & Francis, Wolters Kluwer, and the Royal Society. The technology for the platform was developed via a joint partnership between Meta and SRI International.

Merge with Chan Zuckerberg Initiative
Meta merged with the Chan Zuckerberg Initiative in 2017, marking the Initiative's first acquisition.

Shutdown
On October 28, 2021, the Chan Zuckerberg Initiative announced the sunset of Meta, with a proposed shutdown date of March 31, 2022.

Features and specifications
Meta includes coverage of the biomedical sciences with real-time updates from PubMed and other sources. The website provides access to over 22 million papers with publication dates as early as the 1800s.  By sifting through papers and learning from user behavior, the service pinpoints key pieces of research and provides relevant search results. Meta also provides visualizations about a field of research by organizing papers by their date of publication and citation count and then presenting the information in a way that allows users to quickly identify key historical papers.

The Meta Science research platform uses algorithms that allow users to sort new publications according to subject matter. Users can subscribe to feeds for areas of research including biology, genes, diseases, genetic disorders, drugs, people, labs & institutes, and journals.

References

External links

Science education
Research projects